Carlos Eduardo Romão is a Brazilian Magic: The Gathering player. He is known for his win at the 2002 World Championships. Along with Diego Ostrovich, he is widely regarded as the first South American to achieve success on the Pro Tour, and was the first South American to win a Pro Tour.

Achievements

In 2010, Carlos Romão was invited to play in the 2010 Magic Online World Championships.  The tournament only contained 12 players, the winners of 10 invitation-only Season Championships, the winner of one Last Chance Qualifier and the Magic Online Player of the Year. Romão earned his place by winning the fourth Season Championship.  The event took place alongside the paper World Championships in Chiba, Japan.  Romão would win the tournament defeating Akira Asahara 2-1 in the finals to take the title of 2010 Magic Online World Champion.

References

Living people
Magic: The Gathering players
People from São Paulo
1982 births
Players who have won the Magic: The Gathering World Championship